Marwa Tbini is a Tunisian footballer who plays as a defender for ASF Sahel and the Tunisia women's national team.

Club career
Tbini has played for Sahel in Tunisia.

International career
Tbini capped for Tunisia at senior level during the 2014 African Women's Championship qualification.

See also
List of Tunisia women's international footballers

References

External links

Year of birth missing (living people)
Living people
People from Sousse
Tunisian women's footballers
Women's association football defenders
Tunisia women's international footballers